Regional assembly may refer to:
Regional Assemblies in the Czech Republic (Zastupitelstvo kraje) of regions of the Czech Republic
Eastern Rumelian Regional Assembly (or Parliament), of the autonomous Ottoman province of Eastern Rumelia (in modern Bulgaria); the Plovdiv Regional Historical Museum now occupies the building
Regional Assemblies in England
Regional Assemblies of Eritrea
Regional Assemblies of Ethiopia, of the nine ethnically-based administrative Regions of Ethiopia
Conseil régional (Regional Council, or Assembly), see Regional councils of France
Regional Assemblies of the Regierungsbezirk of Germany
Regional Assemblies in Ireland
Regional assemblies of ancient Macedon, see Macedon#Regional districts (Merides)
ARMM Regional Legislative Assembly, Autonomous Region in Muslim Mindanao, Philippines, see Autonomous Region in Muslim Mindanao#Politics
Regional Assembly of Parliamentarians of the Organisation of Eastern Caribbean States, to be created by the Economic Union Treaty
Provincial assemblies of Pakistan, legislative bodies in the provinces and regions of Pakistan
Assembleia Legislativa (Legislative Assemblies, or Parliaments) of the two Autonomous regions of Portugal: the Azores and Madeira
Regional Assembly of Príncipe, since autonomy was granted within São Tomé and Príncipe in 1994
South Tyrol Regional Assembly, Italy
Southern Regional Assembly in Sudan, created by the Addis Ababa Agreement (1972), see History of Sudan (Nimeiri Era, 1969-1985)

See also
Cornish Assembly
Regional Assemblies (Preparations) Act 2003, England
Regional Planning Councils, Florida, United States
Assembly (disambiguation)
Other types of deliberative assembly:
House of Assembly
Legislative Assembly
National Assembly
Thing (assembly)